The Shade Room (TSR) is a media company, founded by Angelica Nwandu in March 2014. Instagram-based, The Shade Room offers celebrity and trending news on an hourly basis, predominantly within the African American community; The New York Times called it the "TMZ of Instagram". "Shade" in this case refers to a slang term for quips or wisecracks, especially those made with the intent of debasing their target(s).

Nwandu lives and works from Los Angeles and employs a staff of five working on The Shade Room. The Shade Room has also been compared to MediaTakeOut with one exception, the majority of The Shade Room's news is reported primarily on Instagram.

Format 
Nwandu avoided the typical blog format in favor of publishing full-length stories on Instagram. Nwandu found Instagram suited to her vision for The Shade Room due to its image-based format.
After getting established in the Instagram format, the site was then expanded to include community news, trending news, and user interaction. The Shade Room refers to readers as "roommates", who often provide leads on celebrities to The Shade Room personnel. 

Readers of The Shade Room are called "Roommates" because they "live" in The Shade Room, some visitors return on a daily basis.

By the end of 2015, the site was reported to have 2.6 million followers, although the company has less than a dozen employees.

In June 2016, Cosmopolitan reported that The Shade Room's followers across platforms totaled more than eight million people.

The site now boasts more than 17 million followers and has since launched a new brand, The Shade Room Teens, that has 1.2 million followers. 

The high readership has drawn celebrity attention to The Shade Room and some have even participated directly on the site. Nwandu no longer is the primary voice of the site, having stepped back to allow others participate.

In October 2020, the TSR reported 21 million followers on their Instagram account.

Coverage 

On October 10, 2015, The Shade Room was one of the first to report that Lamar Odom was found at Dennis Hoff's Love Ranch in Nevada.

On December 12, 2015, Countess Vaughn, former star of the hit show Moesha posted an apology to Brandy on Instagram. This apology was monumental as Brandy told Vibe Magazine in 1998 that Vaughn left the show out of jealousy. The Shade Room was the first to report the apology with platforms like Vibe, Black Entertainment Television and Rolling Out Magazine covering the story shortly thereafter.

In January 2016, The Shade Room covered the love triangle brewing between Soulja Boy and Nia Riley and Nas Smith, all reality stars from the hit show Love & Hip Hop: Hollywood. This controversy sparked an original song where The Shade Room was mentioned in the lyrics.

On February 22, 2016, The Shade Room was the first to report a fight outside of a Miami nightclub with rap star Trina.

Accolades
Recognizing founder Nwandu on its 2016 30 Under 30 list, Forbes said she "revolutionized celebrity gossip" with the founding of The Shade Room. TechCrunch named her to its list of "18 Female Founders Who Killed It in 2015" and BuzzFeed says Nwandu is "figuring things out faster than everyone else."

References

External links 
 

American news websites
Internet properties established in 2014
2014 establishments in the United States
Instagram
Instagram accounts